The Government Palace is the executive office building of the Council of State of Finland. It overlooks the Senate Square in central Helsinki, Finland. The Government Palace houses the Prime Minister's Office, the Office of the Chancellor of Justice and
most departments of the Ministry of Finance. Its former name is the Senate House (Senaatintalo). The building is usually not open to the public but on occasions there are open days.

History 

Work on building the Senate began in 1818. The Senate moved to the palace overlooking Senate Square in 1822. The wing on the Aleksanterinkatu side was completed in 1824 followed by the Ritarinkatu wing in 1828. The Hallituskatu side was not closed off until several decades later with a courtyard annex added in 1860 to house the Senate printing press. The Ritarikatu and Hallituskatu sides were later subsequently renovated and altered. The Government Palace acquired its present appearance between 1916 and 1917 with the heightening of the Ritarikatu wing.

In addition to the organs of the Senate itself, the Senate building was in the early years also home to a wide range of other important public agencies and offices, including the predecessor of the Bank of Finland, Postal Directorate, Customs Board and National Archives. The Imperial Alexander Pharmacy was also located in the Senate building before it moved to the building completed on the opposite side of Senate Square in 1832.

In 1904 Eugen Schauman shot Governor-General of Finland Nikolai Bobrikov in the second floor level of the staircase of the building.

Gallery

See also 

 Presidential Palace, Helsinki
 Eduskuntatalo

References

Further reading

External links 
 
 

Buildings and structures in Helsinki
Carl Ludvig Engel buildings
Palaces in Finland
Neoclassical architecture in Finland
Kruununhaka